Cyclochlorotine (CC), also known as islanditoxin is a mycotoxin produced by the fungus Penicillium islandicum that causes liver damage and has carcinogenic properties. Japanese researchers confirmed that it was one of three strains of Penicillin fungi responsible for yellowed rice. It is listed as an IARC Group 3 carcinogen.

Chemically, it is a dichlorinated cyclic peptide. Structurally, the only thing that differentiates cyclochlorotine from the plant-derived astins of Aster tataricus, is replacement of a serine with a second 2-aminobutyrate.

Cyclochlorotine  are  one of the toxins usually  found in foods in the grains group like rice , wheat, soybeans, peanuts , beans, bread  and flour etc. Such foods serve as medium for  the growth of molds like Penicillium islandicum which in turn releases toxins like cyclochlorotine etc.
Research shows the detailed biosynthesis of Cyclochlorotine which is a multi step mechanism and makes use of a vital component in the last step known as NRPS ( CctN) which helps produce the desired Cyclochlorotine.

References 

IARC Group 3 carcinogens
Organochlorides
Cyclic peptides
Mycotoxins
Halogen-containing natural products